Little Russia Governorate may refer to:

Little Russia Governorate (1764–1781)
Little Russia Governorate (1796–1802)